This is a list of Lucha Libre USA events, detailing all professional wrestling cards promoted, co-promoted by Lucha Libre USA.

Live events

2010

2012

2013

Results

Lucha Libre USA Live! (2010)

Charlotte

This event was produced by Lucha Libre USA held on August 28, 2010, in Charlotte, North Carolina at the Bojangles Coliseum.

Corpus Christi

This event was produced by Lucha Libre USA held on September 9, 2010, in Corpus Christi, Texas at the Whataburger Field.

Amarillo

This event was produced by Lucha Libre USA held on October 24, 2010, in Amarillo, Texas at the Amarillo Civic Center.

Masked Warriors Live! (2012)

Reno

This event was produced by Lucha Libre USA held on March 23, 2012, in Reno, Nevada at the Reno Events Center.

Stockton

This event was produced by Lucha Libre USA held on March 25, 2012, in Stockton, California at the Stockton Arena.

San Jose

This event was produced by Lucha Libre USA held on March 30, 2012, in San Jose, California at the HP Pavilion.

Pico Rivera

This event was produced by Lucha Libre USA held on April 13, 2012, in Pico Rivera, California at the Pico Rivera Sports Arena.

Fresno

This event was produced by Lucha Libre USA held on April 14, 2012, in Fresno, California at the Selland Arena.

Houston

This event was produced by Lucha Libre USA held on April 20, 2012, in Houston, Texas at the Bayou Music Center.

Phoenix

This event was produced by Lucha Libre USA held on April 29, 2012, in Phoenix, Arizona at the Celebrity Theater.

San Antonio

This event was produced by Lucha Libre USA held on May 11, 2012, in San Antonio, Texas at the Illusions Theater.

Round Rock

This event was produced by Lucha Libre USA held on May 12, 2012, in Round Rock, Texas at the Dell Diamond.

United We Stand Tour (2013)

Ontario

This event was produced by Lucha Libre USA held on April 13, 2013, in Ontario, California at the Citizens Business Bank Arena.

Houston II

This event was produced by Lucha Libre USA held on April 19, 2013, in Houston, Texas at the Funplex Entertainment Center.

Phoenix II

This event was produced by Lucha Libre USA held on April 21, 2013, in Phoenix, Arizona at the GCU Arena.

Great American Nightmare (2013)

Pomona

This event was produced by Lucha Libre USA held on October 20, 2013, in Pomona, California at the Fairplex. This event was an attraction as part of Rob Zombie's Great American Nightmare Festival.

See also

List of Lucha Libre USA: Masked Warriors episodes

References

Events
Professional wrestling-related lists